Liriope may refer to:

Liriope (nymph), the mother of Narcissus by the river-god Cephissus, according to Ovid's Metamorphoses.
Liriope (plant), a genus of plants in the lily family, named for the nymph
Liriope (cnidarian), a genus of hydrozoans in the family Geryoniidae 
414 Liriope, a main belt asteroid, also named for the nymph